The list of Korea University people includes notable alumni, faculty, and administrators affiliated with Korea University.

Business
 Chung Mong-won (BBA 1979) – CEO of Halla Group and Mando Corporation
 Park, Jae-sam: Co-CEO, Celltrion Entertainment
 Lee Jay-hyun, chairman of CJ Group
 Shin Dong-won, chairman and CEO of Nongshim

Law and politics

Presidents
 Lee Myung Bak: 10th president of South Korea ; former mayor of Seoul; former President of Hyundai Group

Prime Ministers
 Heo Jeong: former acting prime minister during the First Republic of Korea interim government

Congressmen
 Hong Jun-pyo: current chairperson of the ruling Grand National Party

Other political figures and activists
 Oh Se Hoon: former mayor of Seoul
 Sukhee Kang: current mayor of Irvine, California
 Yoon Chang-jung: former spokesman of Blue House.

Literature
 Kim Hoon: A Korean novelist
 Park Hyoung-su: Korean author

Entertainment

Sports

Academics

College founders and presidents
 Kim Jung-bae: former President of Korea University; Founder and Chairman, Goguryeo Research Society (Goguryeo Yeongudan); Professor Emeritus, Korea University Department of History; Ancient Historian.*

Professors and scholars
 Do-ol (Young-Oak Kim): Internationally renowned philosopher.

Faculty
 Park Gil Sung: leading sociology professor in Korea

References

External links
 Korea University

Korea University

zh:高麗大學#知名校友